SR Corporation (formerly Suseo High Speed Rail Corporation), also known as Supreme Railways, is a South Korean rail operator that operates high-speed rail services. As of January 2021, the company's services called at 17 stations, three of which it managed directly.

History 
The organisation was originally established as the Suseo High Speed Rail Corporation (수서고속철도주식회사, 水西高速鐵道株式會社) in December 2013. During June 2014, it was announced that the company name would be changed to SR Corporation; one month later, it joined the Korea Railway Association.

In December 2016, SR Corporation officially launched SRT(Super Rapid Train) services, initially running between Suseo–Busan on a newly-opened high speed line. Being an open-access operator, it is charged more for track access than the national incumbent Korail's KTX services; SR Corporation has claimed that its presence has increased competition, driving down ticket prices and raising service quality overall, while also contributing to repay the accumulated debts from the construction of Korea’s high-speed network.

During February 2019, it was categorized as a Public Enterprise(준시장형 공공기관). In December 2022, a planned merger between SR Corporation and Korail, a move that the latter has openly advocated for, was abandoned. During January 2023, Lee Jong-guk, SR’s newly appointed CEO, announced that the company would be pursuing greater independence from its majority shareholder, Korail; furthermore, that a comprehensive review of all existing contracts would be conducted. Specific areas of independence include a planned expansion of internal maintenance of rolling stock, including component production.

Services

The Super Rapid Train (SRT) is a high-speed rail service operated by SR. By January 2021, the service consisted of two routes, Suseo–Busan and Suseo–Mokpo. The ticket price is around 10% lower than KTX on average. The SRT(Super Rapid Train) runs the Seoul-Busan route eight minutes faster than KTX.

References

Railway companies of South Korea
Railway companies established in 2013
Companies based in Seoul
South Korean brands
South Korean companies established in 2013